The 18th congressional district of Ohio is an obsolete congressional district last represented by Republican Bob Gibbs. The district voted for the majority party in the House of Representatives in every election since 1954.

After the 2010 census, Ohio lost two congressional seats, and the 18th district became obsolete after the 2012 elections. The territory of the 18th district was divided and placed into several other Ohio districts. A large portion of this district, including Congressman Gibbs' home in Holmes County, became part of the new 7th district in 2013. William McKinley also represented this district from March 4th, 1883 till May 27th, 1884.

List of members representing the district

Election results
The following chart shows historic election results. Bold type indicates victor. Italic type indicates incumbent.

2006 election

Padgett had won a special primary held on September 14, 2006. The rest of the Republican primary field included Holmes County Commissioner Ray Feikert; Jerry Firman of Coshocton; James Brodbelt Harris of Muskingum County; and Ralph Applegate of Columbus. When he announced his withdrawal from the race, Ney identified Padgett as his favored successor. Two other Republican candidates, Dover mayor Richard Homrighausen and Ney aide John Bennett, withdrew from the race. Candidate Greg Zelenitz was rejected by the Tuscarawas County Board of Elections.

References

 Congressional Biographical Directory of the United States 1774–present

18
Former congressional districts of the United States
1833 establishments in Ohio
Constituencies established in 1833
Constituencies disestablished in 2013
2013 disestablishments in Ohio